Norman Edward Breslow (February 21, 1941 – December 9, 2015) was an American statistician and medical researcher.  At the time of his death, he was Professor (Emeritus) of Biostatistics in the School of Public Health, of the University of Washington.  He is co-author or author of hundreds of published works during 1967 to 2015.

Among his many accomplishments is his work with co-author Nicholas Day that developed and popularized the use of case-control matched sample research designs, in the two-volume work Statistical Methods in Cancer Research.  This was with view that matched sample studies have a role within larger program of many types of studies, in making progress on a vast and important problem like cancer.  Matched sample studies can quickly and cheaply test some hypothesized relationships, but their apparent findings are not definitive, and there's much they cannot accomplish.  Their results, however, can inform the design of slow and expensive longitudinal large-cohort studies that are definitive, for example.  Dose-response studies and other studies, too, are elements of a rational scientific program to address cancer. In 2015, he died of prostate cancer.

Breslow was an Honorary Fellow of the Royal Statistical Society of the U.K. His other professional awards an honors include: ``the Speigelman Gold Medal Award from the American Public Health Association (1978); the Snedecor Award (1995) and R.A. Fisher Award (1995) from the Committee of Presidents of Statistical Societies; the Nathan Mantel Award (2002) from the ASA Section on Statistics in Epidemiology; the Marvin Zelen Leadership Award in Statistical Science from Harvard University (2008); and the Medal of Honor, International Agency for Research on Cancer (2005)". He was also a fellow of the American Association for the Advancement of Science at the same time as his father, Lester Breslow.

References

Norman Breslow dies at 74; biostatistician's work led to advances in medical research, Los Angeles Times, December 28, 2015. Accessed June 28, 2018
Dr. Norman Breslow, 74, dies; UW biostatistician led advances in medical research, Seattle Times, December 31, 2015. Accessed June 28, 2018

External links
 Conference on Statistical Methods in Epidemiology and Observational Studies
 

1941 births
2015 deaths
American statisticians
American medical researchers
Fellows of the American Statistical Association
People from Minneapolis
Fellows of the American Association for the Advancement of Science
Biostatisticians
Fellows of the Royal Statistical Society
Members of the National Academy of Medicine